This is a list of monuments that are classified by the Moroccan ministry of culture around Ouarzazate.

Monuments and sites in Ouarzazate 

|}

References 

Ouarzazate
Ouarzazate Province